The following page is a list of power stations in the Democratic Republic of the Congo. As of December 2015, installed electric generation capacity totalled 2,442 megawatts, but only half that capacity is functioning.

Hydroelectric

Operational

Under construction or proposed

See also 

 List of power stations in Africa
 List of largest power stations in the world

References

External links
 Rusizi III Power Plant Output To Be Shared between Burundi, Rwanda and DRC
|| Proposed || 

Power stations in the Democratic Republic of the Congo
Congo-Kinshasa
Power stations